The Mind's I is the third studio album by the Swedish melodic death metal band Dark Tranquillity, released in 1997.

In 2004, The Mind's I was re-released under Osmose Productions and in 2005 by Century Media Records with new layouts, the four-song Enter Suicidal Angels EP, two live videos and the music video for the song "Hedon".

Track listing

Credits

Dark Tranquillity
 Mikael Stanne − vocals
 Niklas Sundin − lead guitar
 Fredrik Johansson − rhythm guitar, drums (12)
 Martin Henriksson − bass
 Anders Jivarp − drums (1-11, 13-17)

Guests
Michael Nicklasson - backing vocals on "Zodijackyl Light"
Anders Fridén - co-vocals (Mantra) on "Hedon"
Sara Svensson - co-vocals on "Insanity's Crescendo"
Fredrik Nordström - keyboards
Kenneth Johansson - cover art & band photography
前田岳彦 (Takehiko Maeda) - liner notes

References

Dark Tranquillity albums
1997 albums
Albums recorded at Studio Fredman
Osmose Productions albums
Albums produced by Fredrik Nordström